The Naples Lely Classic was a golf tournament on the LPGA Tour from 1973 to 1975. It was played at the Lely Country Club in Naples, Florida.

Winners
1975 Sandra Haynie
1974 Carol Mann
1973 Kathy Whitworth

See also
The Sarah Coventry, another LPGA Tour event played at Lely Country Club in 1976.

References

Former LPGA Tour events
Golf in Florida
Sports in Naples, Florida
Women's sports in Florida
Recurring sporting events established in 1973
Recurring  sporting events disestablished in 1975
1973 establishments in Florida
1975 disestablishments in Florida